Aschlin Ditta (born 20 June 1968) is a British television and film screenwriter and actor.

Biography
Aschlin Ditta was born on 20 June 1968 in Barnet, north London, UK, and was brought up in Leicester and then Ely in the Fens, attending King's Ely school. His father, Douglas, was an actor and his mother, Pamela, a florist. Aschlin works as a television and film writer. His background is in comedy and he was a stand-up comedian and actor, having trained at the Webber Douglas Academy of Dramatic Art, London.

He has written and acted in three series and two specials of The Catherine Tate Show with Catherine Tate, winning several awards, and has written for many television shows including Channel 4's No Angels. He has also written several feature films including Scenes of a Sexual Nature (2006) and French Film (2009) for which he won Best Screenplay at the Monte Carlo Film Festival, 2008. He lives in North London with his partner, the actress Georgina Rich, and their daughter Nancy (born 2009). Ditta also wrote Mr. Sloane.

Writing credits

References

External links

1968 births
British television writers
English television writers
English screenwriters
English male screenwriters
British male television writers
Living people
People educated at King's Ely